Max Lambert Peter van Heeswijk (born 2 March 1973 in  Hoensbroek, Limburg) is a Dutch retired professional road racing cyclist. He finished 15th road race at the 2000 Summer Olympics and 17th in the road race at the 2004 Summer Olympics.

Career achievements

Major results

1992
 1st Omloop Alblasserwaard
1993
 2nd Overall Sachsen-Tour
 2nd Ronde van Limburg
1994
 1st Stages 2, 12, 13 & 15 Commonwealth Bank Classic
 1st Stage 1 Teleflex Tour
 2nd Ronde van Vlaanderen U23
1995
 1st Hel van het Mergelland
 1st Stages 2 & 4 Tour of Galicia
 1st Stage 3 Tour de Luxembourg
 1st Stage 3 Niederösterreich Rundfahrt
 9th Paris–Brussels
1996
 1st Stage 2 Tour of the Netherlands
 1st Stage 4 Tour of Galicia
 3rd Overall Tour of Sweden
1997
 1st Stage 22 Vuelta a España
 2nd Clásica de Almería
 9th GP Rik Van Steenbergen
1998
 1st Profronde van Heerlen
 1st Stage 3 Tour of Austria
 1st Stage 4 Vuelta a Andalucía
 3rd Trofeo Luis Puig
 4th Omloop Het Volk
 6th Pari–Tours
 9th Rund um den Henninger Turm
 9th Veenendaal–Veenendaal
1999
 1st GP de la Ville de Rennes
 1st Stage 5 Tour Méditerranéen
 2nd Paris–Camembert
 3rd Route Adélie
 6th Veenendaal–Veenendaal
2000
 1st Paris–Brussels
 1st Stage 1 Hessen Rundfahrt
 1st Stage 6 Tour of the Netherlands
 1st Stage 5 Niedersachsen-Rundfahrt
 1st Stages 1 & 2 Volta ao Distrito de Santarém
 3rd GP de la Ville de Rennes
 7th Grote Prijs Jef Scherens
 10th E3 Prijs Vlaanderen
2001
 1st Stage 2 Volta a Catalunya
 8th GP Rudy Dhaenens
 9th Overall Guldensporentweedaagse
2002
 1st Stage 2 Route du Sud
 3rd Road race, National Road Championships
 6th Veenendaal–Veenendaal
 7th Sparkassen Giro Bochum
 8th Overall Circuit Franco-Belge
 9th Paris–Roubaix
2003
 1st Stage 4 Tour de l'Ain
 2nd Omloop Het Volk
 3rd Classic Haribo
 2nd Nationale Sluitingprijs
 3rd Road race, National Road Championships
 3rd Dwars door Vlaanderen
 9th Gent–Wevelgem
 10th E3 Prijs Vlaanderen
2004
 1st Stage 6 Volta a Catalunya
 Tour of the Netherlands
1st Stages 1 & 2
1st  Points classification
 Vuelta a Andalucía
1st Stages 2 & 4
1st  Points classification
 1st Stages 1 & 3 Vuelta a Murcia
 1st Nokere Koerse
 1st Nationale Sluitingprijs
 1st Wachovia Invitational
 3rd Overall Tour of Belgium
1st Stage 3
 5th Milan–San Remo
 5th Overall Danmark Rundt
1st  Points classification
 6th Overall Four Days of Dunkirk
1st Stage 6
 Held  after Stage 2 Vuelta a España
2005
 Vuelta a España
1st Stage 7
Held  after Stages 1 & 2
 1st Stages 1 & 5 Eneco Tour of Benelux
 3rd Road race, National Road Championships
 4th Nationale Sluitingprijs
 5th Trofeo Luis Puig
 8th Omloop Het Volk
2006
 1st Stage 1 Tour of Poland
 3rd Veenendaal–Veenendaal
 3rd Overall Tour of Belgium
2007
 1st Stage 3 Vuelta a Andalucía
 7th Gent–Wevelgem

Grand Tour general classification results timeline

See also
 List of Dutch Olympic cyclists

References

External links 
 

1973 births
Living people
Cyclists at the 2000 Summer Olympics
Cyclists at the 2004 Summer Olympics
Dutch male cyclists
Dutch Vuelta a España stage winners
Olympic cyclists of the Netherlands
Sportspeople from Heerlen
UCI Road World Championships cyclists for the Netherlands
Cyclists from Limburg (Netherlands)
21st-century Dutch people